Panicum simile, known by the common name two colour panic, is a species of grass found in eastern Australia. It was described by Karel Domin in 1915.

References

simile
Poales of Australia
Flora of Queensland
Flora of New South Wales
Flora of Victoria (Australia)
Plants described in 1915